Air Marshal Manavendra Singh, PVSM, AVSM,  VrC, VSM, ADC is a retired officer of the Indian Air Force. He served as the Air Officer Commanding-in-Chief (AOC-in-C), Training Command. He assumed the office on 25 September 2021 succeeding Air Marshal Rajiv Dayal Mathur. Previously, he served as Air Officer Commanding-in-Chief, Southern Air Command.

Early life and education 
Manavendra Singh is an alumnus of National Defence Academy. He is also a graduate of Army War College, Defence Services Staff College and Joint Forces Staff College, Norfolk, Virginia.

Career
Manavendra Singh was commissioned in the Indian Air Force as a helicopter pilot on 29 December 1982. In a career spanning over 38 years, he has as over 6,600 hours of flying experience and has a service experience in various sectors like the Siachen, the North East, Uttarakhand, the Western desert.

He has commanded front line bases in Bukavu, DRC during peacekeeping mission.

Prior to his appointment as AOC-in-C, Southern Air command, he served as Director General of Inspection and Flight Safety.

In December 2021, he was appointed as the head of the Tri-Services Inquiry to investigate the reason of  Coonoor Mi-17 Crash which claimed the life of 14 including CDS Gen. Bipin Rawat and his Wife.

He superannuated on 31 December 2022 after 40 years of service and was succeeded by Air Marshal Jonnalagedda Chalapati as the AOC-in-C, Training Command.

Honours and decorations 
During his career, Manavendra Singh has been awarded the Ati Vishisht Seva Medal, VrC, VSM for his service. He was awarded the Param Vishisht Seva Medal in 2022.

References 

Living people
Indian Air Force air marshals
National Defence Academy (India) alumni
Recipients of the Ati Vishisht Seva Medal
Recipients of the Vir Chakra
Recipients of the Vishisht Seva Medal
Year of birth missing (living people)
Recipients of the Param Vishisht Seva Medal
Defence Services Staff College alumni
Joint Forces Staff College alumni